This list comprises all players who have participated in at least one league match for San Fernando Valley Quakes from the team's first season in 2006 to their last in 2008. Players who were on the roster but never played a first team game are not listed; players who appeared for the team in other competitions (US Open Cup, etc.) but never actually made an USL appearance are noted at the bottom of the page where appropriate.

A
  Harry Abraham
  Fergie Agwu
  Austin Alvarado
  Sean Alvarado
  Jamen Amato
  Mike R Anderson
  Josh Ault
  Eric Avila

B
  Diego Barrera
  Will Beard
  Chad Borak
  Tristan Bowen
  Gerardo Bravo
  Jhonny Bravo
  Tommy Burlic
  Bryan Byrne

C
  Ryan Callahan
  Taylor Canel
  Stephen Carlson
  Marcus Chorvat
  Alex Christensen
  Joel Crompton

D
  Kyle Dagan
  Mat Davis
  Devin Deldo

E
  Jose Esquivel

F
  Greg Folk
  Sean Franklin
  Eric Frimpong

G
  Trini Gomez
  Maxwell Griffin
  Juan Guerrero
  Kevin Guppy
  Patricio Gutierrez

H
  Derek Hanks
  Kamani Hill
  Aaron Hunter

J
  Wayne Johnson
  Bryan Jordan

K
  Sung-Hyun Kim
  Kevin Klasila

L
  Rod Lafaurie
  Josh Lederer
  Josh Leon
  Jason Leopoldo
  Dylan Leslie
  Adrian Lopez

M
  Garrett Maloney

N
  Kyle Nakazawa
  Mike Nieraeth

O
  Sean O'Connor
  Danny Ortiz

P
  Daniel Paladini
  Robert Pate
  Brian Phillips

Q
  Jeff Quijano

R
  Camilo Rojas
  Brad Rusin

S
  Ryan Shaw
  Cory Shilcock-Elliot
  Oscar Sims
  Willie Sims
  Adam Sloustcher
  Justin Szabo

T
  Chris Thompson
  Matt Tracy

W
  Zach Walker
  R. J. Wilson

Z
  Mike Zaher

Sources

San Fernando Valley Quakes
 
Association football player non-biographical articles